Tyson Strachan (born October 30, 1984) is a Canadian former professional ice hockey defenceman. He most recently played for the Cardiff Devils in the EIHL. He was drafted by the Carolina Hurricanes in the fifth round, 137th overall, in the 2003 NHL Entry Draft.

Playing career
He played at Ohio State University for four seasons (2003–07), and with the Albany River Rats in the American Hockey League in 2006-07 for one game, before joining the Peoria Rivermen (AHL) and Las Vegas Wranglers (ECHL) in 2007-08.

He was signed as a free agent by the St. Louis Blues on October 9, 2008. During the 2008–09 season he was recalled from the Peoria Rivermen under emergency conditions on December 16, 2008, after playing in two pre-season games with the Blues and 28 games for the Rivermen. He made his NHL debut on December 18, against the Washington Capitals at Washington and three nights later scored his first NHL Point (assist) on December 21 against the Boston Bruins, at St. Louis.

On July 12, 2011, Strachan agreed to one-year, two-way deal with Florida Panthers. On January 23, 2012, he was called up to replace injured defenceman Dmitri Kulikov. On February 1, 2012, he recorded his 1st point as a Panther with an assist on a Mikael Samuelsson goal. He recorded his 1st career goal on February 12, 2012 against Evgeni Nabokov of the New York Islanders.

On July 8, 2013, Strachan agreed to one-year, two-way deal as a free agent with the Washington Capitals. He was originally assigned to AHL affiliate, the Hershey Bears, before he was recalled and featured in 18 games over the course of the 2013–14 season with the Capitals.

On July 3, 2014, Strachan signed as a free agent with the Buffalo Sabres on a one-year, two-way contract.

On July 2, 2015, having left the Sabres as a free agent, Strachan signed a one-year, two-way contract with the Minnesota Wild. He was primarily assigned to AHL affiliate, the Iowa Wild, appearing in 67 games and providing 13 points in the 2015–16 season. He was recalled by the Wild on numerous occasions however featured in 2 scoreless games.

As a free agent in the following summer, Strachan was unable to attain a NHL deal. On September 14, 2016, he agreed to a one-year AHL deal with the Rochester Americans, affiliate to his former club the Buffalo Sabres. He featured in 61 games with the Americans, contributing 1 goal and 12 points.

On September 7, 2017, with ambition to return to the NHL, Strachan agreed to attend the Arizona Coyotes training camp on a professional try-out contract.

On October 18, 2017 Strachan signed for the Cardiff Devils in the EIHL. In the 2017–18 season, Strachan was a regular on the blueline for the Devils, appearing in 47 games for 15 points and helping claim the EIHL championship.

Career statistics

References

External links

1984 births
Albany River Rats players
Buffalo Sabres players
Canadian ice hockey defencemen
Carolina Hurricanes draft picks
Cardiff Devils players
Florida Panthers players
Hershey Bears players
Ice hockey people from Saskatchewan
Iowa Wild players
Las Vegas Wranglers players
Living people
Minnesota Wild players
Ohio State Buckeyes men's ice hockey players
People from Melfort, Saskatchewan
Peoria Rivermen (AHL) players
Rochester Americans players
St. Louis Blues players
San Antonio Rampage players
Vernon Vipers players
Washington Capitals players
Canadian expatriate ice hockey players in the United States
Canadian expatriate ice hockey players in Wales